Wat Phraya Krai is one of three khwaeng (sub-district) of Bang Kho Laem district, Bangkok. It has a total area of 2.300 km2 (round about 0.888 mi2) west side along Chao Phraya river and in late 2017, it had a total population of 26,681 people.

History
Its name means "Phraya Krai Temple", which comes from the namesake temple that used to be located here in the past. It is assumed that the temple was built before 1801. Later, Phraya Shoduek Ratchasetthi (magnate Boonma), who was the former governor for King Nangklao (Rama III), restored the temple as a royal monastery, renaming the temple to "Wat Chotanaram", and also enshrined the famous Golden Buddha image at this temple (currently enshrined at Wat Traimit in Chinatown).

Later in the reign of King Chulalongkorn (Rama V), the temple had no patrons to maintain the temple and was abandoned. The chapel, including other buildings, went into ruins, eventually turning into free land for the East Asiatic Company to rent for the location as its head office in Bangkok (currently Asiatique The Riverfront). But the name Wat Phraya Krai still appears to this day as the name of the sub-district and locations within that sub-district, such as Watprayakrai Police Station and Wat Phraya Krai Post Office etc.

Places of interest

Asiatique The Riverfront
Shrewsbury International School
Masjid Al Bayaan
Masjid Bang Uthit
Masjid Darul Abideen
Chatrium Hotel Riverside Bangkok
Protestant Cemetery
Ramada Plaza Menam Riverside Bangkok
Wat Ratcha Singkhorn
Wat Worachanyawas

Main roads
Charoen Krung Road
Chan Road

References

Subdistricts of Bangkok
Bang Kho Laem district